Galium argense (Argus bedstraw) is a plant species in the Rubiaceae. It is endemic to California and native to Inyo and San Bernardino Counties. It is dioecious, with male and female flowers on separate plants.

References

External links
Galium argense at Gardening Europe

Endemic flora of California
arenarium
Plants described in 1965
Dioecious plants